Flirting or coquetry, is a social and sexual behavior involving spoken or written communication, as well as body language. It is either to suggest interest in a deeper relationship with the another person or, if done playfully, for amusement.

It usually involves speaking and behaving in a way that suggests a mildly greater intimacy than the actual relationship between the parties would justify. This may be accomplished by communicating a sense of playfulness or irony. Double entendres may also be used. Body language can include flicking the hair, eye contact, brief touching, open stances, proximity, and other gestures. Flirting may be done in an under-exaggerated, shy or frivolous style. Vocal communication of interest can include, for example,
 Alterations in vocal tone (such as pace, volume, and intonation),
 Challenges (including teasing, questions, qualifying, and feigned disinterest) that may serve to increase tension, and to test intention and congruity
 Adoration, which includes offers, approval and tact, knowledge and demonstration of poise, self-assurance, smart and stylish, a commanding attitude.

Flirting behavior varies across cultures due to different modes of social etiquette, such as how closely people should stand        (proxemics), how long to hold eye contact, how much touching is appropriate and so forth. Nonetheless, some behaviors may be more universal. For example, ethologist Irenäus Eibl-Eibesfeldt found that in places as different as Africa and North America, women exhibit similar flirting behavior, such as a prolonged stare followed by a nonchalant break of gaze along with a little smile.

Etymology
The origin of the word flirt is obscure. The Oxford English Dictionary (first edition) associates it with such onomatopoeic words as flit and flick, emphasizing a lack of seriousness; on the other hand, it has been attributed to the old French conter fleurette, which means "to (try to) seduce" by the dropping of flower petals, that is, "to speak sweet nothings". While old-fashioned, this expression is still used in French, often mockingly, however the English gallicism, "to flirt" has made its way and has now become an anglicism.

The word fleurette was used in the 16th century in some sonnets, and some other texts. The French word fleurette (small flower), and the language of old south France word flouretas (from the Latin flora (for flower)), are related to some little says where flowers are both at the same time a pretext and the comparison terms. In southern France, some usage were yet used in 1484,
In French, some other words more or less related are derived from the word fleur: for instance effleurer (English: lightly touch) from 13th century esflourée; déflorer (English: deflower) from 13th century desflorer or (fleuret (English Foil) 18th century.

The association of flowers, spring, youth, and women is not modern and were yet considered in ancient culture, such as the Chloris in ancient Greece, or Flora (deity) in the ancient Roman Empire, including Floralia festival, and in other older poems, such as the Song of Songs.

History
During World War II, anthropologist Margaret Mead was working in Britain for the British Ministry of Information and later for the U.S. Office of War Information, delivering speeches and writing articles to help the American soldiers better understand the British civilians, and vice versa. She observed in the flirtations between the American soldiers and British women a pattern of misunderstandings regarding who is supposed to take which initiative. She wrote of the Americans, "The boy learns to make advances and rely upon the girl to repulse them whenever they are inappropriate to the state of feeling between the pair", as contrasted to the British, where "the girl is reared to depend upon a slight barrier of chilliness... which the boys learn to respect, and for the rest to rely upon the men to approach or advance, as warranted by the situation." This resulted, for example, in British women interpreting an American soldier's gregariousness as something more intimate or serious than he had intended.

Communications theorist Paul Watzlawick used this situation, where "both American soldiers and British girls accused one another of being sexually brash", as an example of differences in "punctuation" in interpersonal communications. He wrote that courtship in both cultures used approximately 30 steps from "first eye contact to the ultimate consummation", but that the sequence of the steps was different. For example, kissing might be an early step in the American pattern but a relatively intimate act in the English pattern.

Japanese courtesans had another form of flirting, emphasizing non-verbal relationships by hiding the lips and showing the eyes, as depicted in much Shunga art, the most popular print media at the time, until the late 19th century.

European hand fans

The fan was extensively used as a means of communication and therefore a way of flirting from the 16th century onwards in some European societies, especially England and Spain. A whole sign language was developed with the use of the fan, and even etiquette books and magazines were published. Charles Francis Badini created the Original Fanology or Ladies' Conversation Fan, which was published by William Cock in London in 1797. The use of the fan was not limited to women, as men also carried fans and learned how to convey messages with them. For instance, placing the fan near the heart meant "I love you", while opening a fan wide meant "Wait for me".

In Spain, where the use of fans (called "abanicos") is still very popular today, ladies used them to communicate with suitors or prospective suitors without attracting the notice of their families or chaperons. This use was highly popular during the 19th and early 20th centuries.

Purpose

People flirt for a variety of reasons. According to social anthropologist Kate Fox, there are two main types of flirting: flirting just for fun and flirting with further intent.

In a 2014 review, sociologist David Henningsen identified six main motivations for flirting: sex, relational development, exploration, fun, self-esteem, and as a means to an end. Henningsen found that many flirting interactions involve more than one of these motives. There also appear to be gender differences in flirting motivation.

Courtship
Many people flirt as a courtship initiation method, with the aim of engaging in a sexual relationship with another person. In this sense, flirting plays a role in the mate-selection process. The person flirting will send out signals of sexual availability to another, and expects to see the interest returned in order to continue flirting. Flirting can involve non-verbal signs, such as an exchange of glances, hand-touching, and hair-touching; or verbal signs, such as chatting, giving flattering comments, and exchanging telephone numbers in order to initiate further contact.

Many studies have confirmed that sex is a motivation for flirting. Additionally, Messman and colleagues' study provided support for this hypothesis; it demonstrated that, the more one was physically attracted to a person, the higher the chances one would flirt with them.

Flirting with the goal of signaling interest appears as a puzzling phenomenon when considering that flirting is often performed very subtly. In fact, evidence shows that people are often mistaken in how they interpret flirting behaviors. Logically, if the main purpose of flirting is to signal interest to the other person, then the signaling would be done clearly and explicitly. A possible explanation for the ambiguous nature of human flirting lies in the costs associated with courtship signals. Indeed, according to Gersick and colleagues, signaling interest can be costly as it can lead to the disturbance of the nature of a relationship. For instance, signaling sexual interest to a friend bears the risk of introducing uncertainty into the friendship, especially if the romantic advance is rejected by the recipient. For this reason, individuals prefer engaging in a flirting interaction that is more subtle to limit the risks associated with the expression of sexual interest.

More generally, human relationships are governed by social norms and whenever these are broken, one can suffer significant costs that can range from social, economic and even legal nature. As an illustration, a manager flirting with his subordinate can lead to strong costs such as being accused of sexual harassment, which can potentially lead to job loss.

Additionally, third parties can impose costs on someone expressing sexual interest. Expressing sexual interest to somebody else's romantic partner is a highly punishable act. This often leads to jealousy from the person's partner which can trigger anger and (possible) physical punishment, especially in men. Third parties can also impose costs through the act of eavesdropping. These can lead to damage to one's reputation leading to possible social, economic and legal costs.

A last point to consider is that the costs associated with interest signaling are magnified in the case of humans, when compared to the animal world. Indeed, the existence of language means that information can circulate much faster. For instance, in the case of eavesdropping, the information overhead by the eavesdropper can be spread to very large social networks, thereby magnifying the social costs.

Other motivations
Another reason people engage in flirting is to consolidate or maintain a romantic relationship with their partner. They will engage in flirting behaviors to promote the flourishing of their relationship with their partner.  People will also flirt with the goal of 'exploring'. In this sense, the aim is not necessarily to express sexual or romantic interest but simply to assess whether the other might be interested in them before making any decision about what they would want from that individual.

Henningsen and Fox also demonstrated that flirting can sometimes be employed just for fun. For instance, studies have shown that flirting in the workplace was used mostly for fun purposes.

Another motive that drives flirting is developing one's own self esteem by encouraging reciprocation.

Gender differences in motivations
Certain types of flirting seem to vary by gender. Henningsen and colleagues' study demonstrated that flirting with sexual intent was found to be more prominent amongst men, while flirting for relationship development purposes was more often employed by women. Additionally, Henningsen found that women may engage in what he calls "practice flirting," or using the behavior to evaluate potential partners.

In evolutionary biology, the parental investment theory states that females are more selective and males are more competitive, therefore predicting that flirting as courtship initiation will be more commonly used by males. The theory also predicts that females provide more resources to their offspring, which causes them to invest in a mate that can contribute to their offspring's survival.

Examples

Flirting may consist of stylized gestures, language, body language, postures, and physiologic signs which act as cues to another person. In Western society these may include:
 Blowing a kiss
 Casual touching; such as gently stroking, touching each other's arms, chest and neck 
 Conversation (e.g. banter, small talk, pickup lines)
 Coyness, marked by cute, coquettish shyness or modesty, coquet or playful aggrandizement of a partner's importance
 Eye contact, batting eyelashes, or staring
 Eyebrow raising
 Flattery (e.g. regarding beauty, sexual attractiveness)
 Footsie, a form of flirtation in which one uses their feet to play with another's
 Hugging
 Imitating or mirroring another's behavior (e.g. taking a drink when the other person takes a drink, changing posture as the other does, foreshadowing or mimicking someone's reactions to successful attraction etc.)
 Laughing, giggling, chuckling encouragingly at any hint of intimacy in the other's behavior
 Maintaining close proximity, such as during casual talking
 Nicknames and other terms of endearment to describe a partner's personality, beauty, or sexiness
 Chatting online, texting, and using other one-on-one and direct messaging services, while hinting affection
 Protean signals or indicators of interest, such as touching one's hair, side-ways glance, and pointing one's chest towards partner's chest
 Partner dancing
 Writing love letters and notes, poems, or presenting small gifts
 Singing specially selected love songs as a declaration of love and devotion in presence of one's partner
 Smiling or grinning at a partner and/or holding them close
 Staging of "chance" encounters or romantic rendezvous
 Sexting
 Teasing
 Tickling
 Winking

Cultural variations
Flirting varies a great deal from culture to culture. 

In "contact cultures," such as those in the Mediterranean or Latin America, closer proximity is common, compared with cultures such as those in Britain or Northern Europe. The variation in social norms may lead to different interpretations of what is considered to be flirting.

In Japan, flirting in the street or public places is known as nanpa.

See also
 Anti-Flirt Club
 Making out
 Public display of affection
 Wingman (social)

References

Sexual attraction
Philosophy of love